is a male Japanese judoka.

He started judo at the age of 4.

His favorite technique is Uchi Mata.

In 2009, he won the gold medal in the -55 kg weight class at the World Judo Championships Juniors in Paris.

In 2010, he won the gold medal in the -60 kg weight class at the World Judo Championships Juniors in Agadir.

In 2015, he won the bronze medal in the Extra-lightweight (60 kg) division at the 2015 World Judo Championships.

References

External links
 

1992 births
Living people
Japanese male judoka
People from Miyazaki Prefecture
Judoka at the 2014 Asian Games
Judoka at the 2018 Asian Games
Asian Games silver medalists for Japan
Asian Games bronze medalists for Japan
Asian Games medalists in judo
Medalists at the 2014 Asian Games
Medalists at the 2018 Asian Games
Universiade medalists in judo
Universiade gold medalists for Japan
Universiade bronze medalists for Japan
Medalists at the 2011 Summer Universiade